Tando Muhammad Khan is a city and headquarter of the Tando Muhammad Khan District located in Sindh, Pakistan. Is is named after Mir Muhammad Khan Talpur Shahwani.

It is the 95th largest city of Pakistan, according to 2017 census. It has a railway station on the Badin–Hyderabad Branch Line.

History 
Tando Muhammad Khan was founded by Mir Muhammad Khan Talpur Shahwani, who died in 1813. 

During the British period, it was a seat of assistant collector. Its status was changed to Municipality in 1856.
Tando Muhammad Khan was carved out of Hyderabad district in April 2005 by then adviser chief minister of Sindh, Mir Ali Nawaz Khan Talpur.
Syed, Bukharis and Mirs are two prominent families in Tando Mohammad Khan, highly active in the politics of Tando Mohammad Khan since centuries

Economy
There are four big sugar mills in Tando Mohammad khan city, and around dozen of rice mills which provide employment to the local people on seasonal bases. The mills are located outskirts of the city. Banking and service remain backbone of the city's economic life.    
Traditional clothing called "Ajrak" is among the most famous Sindhi culture wearing, designed and prepared in Tando Muhammad Khan.

Location 
The town is located at 25°8′N and 68°32′E at an elevation of 11 metres on the right bank of Fuleli canal (old name of Fuleli was Gooni) at distance of 21 miles from Hyderabad. There are 8 police stations in District T.M. Khan which are PS Tando Muhammad Khan, PS Bulri Shah Karim, PS Abadgar, PS Taluka, PS Sheikh Burkio, PS Moya, PS Tando Ghulam Haider and PS Mullakatiar.
Taluka Tando Ghulam Hyder consists of Four Union Council
Tando Ghulam Hyder (main)
Nazarpur
Ghulam Shah Bagrani
Dandies

Union Council Nazarpur consists of Markaz which are given below.
Jagsyani. jagsi Muslim Community political background and this Community belongs to agriculture as (Landlord) the jagsi Community consists on village 
Wahid Dino Jagsi
Haji Karmillah Jagsi
Abdul Rehman Jagsi
Ghulam Mustafa Jagsi
Mohammad Haroon Jagsi

Demography 

People of various background coexist here peacefully. Majority of population consists of Sindhi people, Urdu speaking (mohajir) are the largest minority in Tando Mohammad Khan city. Others ethnic groups are Bagri, Bheels, Kolli, Meghwars, ranghar or rangar, mehwati, Punjabi, Pathans, 
and few others.
All villages are surrounding in the area of Tando Ghulam Hyder union council Nazarpur markaz Jagsyani whole Jagsi Muslim Sunni Community are well-educated communities that are 500 years older living at District Tando Muhammad Khan Taluka Tando Ghulam Hyder.
1. Tando Ghulam Hyder (taluka headquarters): Taluka Tando Ghulam Hyder was created in 2005 by Arbab Ghulam Rahim Chief Minister Sindh. It is being systematized slowly gradually since that. However the town itself is neat and clean where all communities live with peace and brotherhood. As far as the development is concerned then whole this is happening because of efforts of Abdullah Khan Bhatti a well known Social Reformer; under the platform of his own NGO named Social Welfare Association Tando Ghulam Hyder. It is an unregistered NGO but literally he is struggling too much for the welfare of this area particularly. Abdullah Khan Bhatti is a well-educated and known as a social person, that's why he leads to all issues of this area Indiscriminately.

2. There are different communities are living in taluka H/Q Tando Ghulam Hyder for instance: Bhatti Community, Waryah Community, Peer, Sheedi, Khaskheli, Kunbhar and Kathbabhan. Whereas Bhatti community is a well-educated family in Tando Ghulam Hyder and Waryah community is related with agriculture and trade.

Linguistics 

Sindhi and Urdu are the primary language of TMK city. Both are understood and spoken universally. TMK city is linguistically quite rich as it hosts many ethnic and linguistics groups. So, following are the languages spoken in TMK city: Bheeli, Gujarati, Kutchi, Memoni, Mehwati, Bagri, Punjabi, Pushto, Pothowari, Seraiki and Brohui.

See also
Rajo Nizamani

Notes

References
Shahwani Talpurs of Tando Muhammad Khan
The Royal Talpurs of Sindh

Populated places in Sindh
Tando Muhammad Khan District